The Dornier Komet ("Comet"), Merkur ("Mercury"), Do C, Do D, and Do T were a family of aircraft manufactured in Germany during the 1920s, originally as small airliners, but which saw military use as well. The earliest aircraft in the series were basically landplane versions of the Delphin flying boat, and although the Delphin and Komet/Merkur series diverged from each other, design changes and refinements from one family were often incorporated into the other. All variants were braced high-winged single-engine monoplanes with conventional landing gear.

Design and development
The first Komets (Do C III Komet I) utilised the same rectangular plan,  span wing, tail, and even upper fuselage, as well as the  BMW IIIa engine of the Delphin I, but replaced the lower fuselage and sponsons with a simple sheet-metal bottom that incorporated fixed tailskid undercarriage. The engine installation was also relocated from above the Delphin's nose to a conventional location in the Komet's fuselage nose. Accommodation was provided for a single pilot and four passengers. An improved version, the Do Komet II, was first flown on 9 October 1922 and was widely exported to countries including Colombia, Spain, Switzerland, and the Soviet Union.

The Do Komet III of 1924 was a practically all-new design that shared many elements with the Delphin III. Power was greatly increased from the Komet I, with a  Napier Lion engine. This version was exported to Denmark and Sweden, but was also produced under licence in Japan by Kawasaki.

In 1925, the Komet III was replaced in production by the Do B Merkur I, which featured a revised fin and longer-span wings. When fitted with the BMW VI engine, it became known as the Do B Bal Merkur II, as did indeed any Komets thus re-engined. The type was widely used by Deutsche Luft Hansa, which had some 30 Merkurs operating at one time, and was also exported to Brazil, China, Colombia, Japan, and Switzerland.

The Do C and Do D were follow-on military designs, the former a trainer exported to Chile and Colombia, the latter a floatplane torpedo-bomber built for the Yugoslav Royal Navy. The designation Do T was used for a landplane ambulance version.

Variants
Do C III Komet I
First of the Komet series
Do Komet II

Do Komet III larger, more powerful four-six passenger version.

Do B Merkur I

Do B Bal Merkur II

Do C
Military version of the Komet III
Do C-1: Two-seat fighter.
Do C-2A: Recognition version.
Do C-3: Recognition version.
Do C-4: Do-10, development of C-1.
Do D
A much revised floatplane torpedo bomber version for the Royal Yugoslav Air Force
Do T
An ambulance version

Operators

Civil operators

SCADTA

Deutsche Luft Hansa
Deutsche Luft-Reederei

Ad Astra Aero

Ukrvozdukhput

Deruluft 
Dobrolyot

Military operators

Chilean Air Force
Chilean Navy

Colombian Air Force

Yugoslav Royal Navy

Specifications (Merkur II)

Notes

References

Bibliography

Further reading

External links

 German aircraft between 1919–1945

1920s German airliners
Komet
Single-engined tractor aircraft
Parasol-wing aircraft
Aircraft first flown in 1921